The Oromo Liberation Army (OLA; , WBO) is an armed opposition group active in the Oromia Region of Ethiopia. The OLA consist primarily of former armed members of the pre-peace deal OLF who refused to disarm out of skepticism of the peace deal, and former youth protestors who grew disillusioned with nonviolent resistance.

The Ethiopian government now considers the OLF to be a legal political party but the OLA to be a terrorist group, though the OLA is accused of continuing to act as the armed wing of the OLF. In 2021, the group announced it had established a political wing and would adopt Oromo Liberation Front-Oromo Liberation Army (OLF-OLA) (Oromo: Adda Bilisummaa Oromoo-Waraana Bilisummaa Oromoo, ABO-WBO) as its official name. The Ethiopian government refuses to call the OLA by its chosen name, instead referring to it as Shene, Oneg or OLF-Shene.

Origin

The Oromo Liberation Army, then the military wing of the Oromo Liberation Front (OLF), was formed in 1974, evolving from the Bale Revolt that started in the 1960s in response to government abuses and oppression of Oromo people .

In August 2018, a peace agreement was signed between the Ethiopian government and the OLF, declaring a ceasefire, the OLF's disarming of weapons, the continuation of OLF's activities by "peaceful means", and the creation of a joint committee for implementing the agreement. Some factions of OLF's armed wing, the Oromo Liberation Army, refused to disarm out of skepticism of the government's intent to abide by the agreement, thereby disassociating itself from the OLF and leading to the Oromo Liberation Army separate from the OLF in its current form. Many of the OLF members that disarmed ended up flocking back to the OLA after failing to see components of the peace deal be honored.

Leadership
As of the late 2010s, Jaal Marroo (born Kumsa Diriba) is the commander-in-chief of OLA, largely operating with the Western Command. , Gemechu Aboye was the deputy leader of OLA, according to Sveriges Radio. The OLA international spokesperson is Odaa Tarbii (@OdaaTarbiiWBO).

Aims
In January 2023 the OLF-OLA released a political manifesto in which they laid out their aims: 

"We, the Oromo Liberation Army (OLA), fight for the Oromo people's right to self-determination. We fight for the freedom of the Oromo people from political exclusion, economic exploitation, and socio-cultural marginalization. 

a) We fight to realize the Oromo people’s right to freely determine their political status. For the right of our people to determine their political destiny and establish a responsive government through freely elected representatives. 

b) We fight to secure the Oromo people’s economic sovereignty. To stop the exploitation of our people’s natural and human resources. To develop these resources for the benefit of all. 

c) We fight to realize the socio-cultural rights of our people. We demand respect for and full recognition of the Oromo language, culture, and history. "

Recruitment
Soretti claimed that OLA was attracting recruits in July 2021 because "Oromia [was] a war zone under the administration of the Prosperity Party". According to Odaa Tarbii, OLA spokesperson, 1165 Oromia Special Forces defected to the OLA with 400 of them from Laga Tafo area.

Human rights

Policies
In a press release on December 10, 2022, the OLA High Command stated their war was not with any population group and called on the Oromo people to avoid the Ethiopian governments attempts at sparking confrontations with "our brothers and sisters from different communities". They further added on and called for Oromo's to protect members of ethnic minorities in the Oromia region 

Soretti Kadir argues that the OLA limits extrajudicial executions to officials suspected of war crimes, stating that OLA has a "grading system [to use] when applying international humanitarian law [to] Oromo people", in which people supporting OLA's opponents out of coercion or family need are "not considered a target". Those that are "engaged in supporting the government out of the desire to attain wealth, power, notoriety or, just enjoy oppressing others ... are considered a target."

Accusations
The OLA has been accused of committing extrajudicial executions by the Ethiopian government. The OLA denied the accusations.

On 2 November 2020, 54 people—mostly Amhara women, children and elderly people—were killed in the village of Gawa Qanqa, after government security forces "abruptly and inexplicably left", by attackers identifying themselves as OLA. OLA denied responsibility. Instead saying:

“The OLA would like to express its deepest condolences to all the victims of these terrible atrocities. We also want to underline that we are not responsible for these acts. The local admin[instration] works alongside Oromia Police & ex-OLA defectors to carry out these operations.” 

In June 2022, locals on the ground in Ethiopia accused the OLA of killing over 200 ethnic Amhara. The OLA denies these allegations, instead saying the killings were committed by retreating government forces and militia.The attack you are referring to was committed by the regime’s military and local militia as they retreated from their camp in Gimbi following our recent offensive... They escaped to an area called Tole, where they attacked the local population and destroyed their property as retaliation for their perceived support for the OLA. Our fighters had not even reached that area when the attacks took place.

- OLA International Spokesperson "Odaa Tarbii" in a message to AP News

In their January 2023 political manifesto the OLA reiterated their calls for independent investigations into atrocities or reports of atrocities committed in Oromia, saying "We strongly encourage the international community, through the United Nations and/or other mechanisms, to find out the truth and live up to its pledge of 'Never Again.' On our part, we continue to call for credible, internationally mandated independent investigations into the atrocities or reports of atrocities committed in Oromia."

Military actions

By late October 2021, the OLA controlled various areas in the Welega Zone, Oromia Region including East, West, Kellam, Horo and Illu. On 1 November, Jaal Marroo stated that the OLA had taken "several towns in western, central, and southern Oromia, facing little resistance from government forces who were retreating."

The OLA also used the opportunity presented by the Tigray Conflict to take brief control of Kamisee on 31 October 2021, as the Tigray Defence Forces advanced on Kombolcha.

In late October 2022, the OLA launched a large-scale military offensive into West and East Welega. On 6 November 2022, they entered Nekemte town where they engaged in urban fighting with Ethiopian state forces before a same-day retreat.

Legal status
Meta(Facebook) designates OLA as "Dangerous Individuals and Organizations" on its list of organizations or individuals that proclaim a violent mission or are engaged in violence.

On 6 May 2021, the Ethiopian House of Peoples' Representatives declared OLA to be a terrorist organisation.

Analysis
Soretti Kadir claimed in July 2021 that OLA's actions were "responding to systemic and enduring state violence" by the federal Ethiopian government. Nagesa Dube argues that "OLA does apparently target civilian government employees to instill fear in the public".

References

Ethiopian civil conflict (2018–present)
Organizations designated as terrorist
Rebel groups in Ethiopia